The Jackson Hotel is a historic hotel building located at 139 W. Peoria St. in Paola, Kansas. The hotel was built in 1921 on a site which had contained a hotel since 1863; the Jackson Hotel was the third hotel built at the site. Architect George P. Washburn designed the hotel in the Commercial style. The hotel features a full-length porch on the ground floor and a front entry with a transom and sidelights, a common element of group residences of the era intended to make the building resemble a home. From 1937 to 1969, Paola business directories listed the Jackson Hotel as one of only two in the city, along with the Commercial Hotel; it became the only hotel in 1969 when the Commercial Hotel was demolished. By 1992, the hotel building had been vacated; it remained empty until a 2006 redevelopment effort.

The hotel was added to the National Register of Historic Places on July 9, 2008.

References

Hotel buildings on the National Register of Historic Places in Kansas
Commercial Style architecture in the United States
Hotel buildings completed in 1921
Buildings and structures in Miami County, Kansas
1921 establishments in Kansas
National Register of Historic Places in Miami County, Kansas